Alice Lake is an alpine lake in the western United States in central Idaho, located high in the Sawtooth Mountains in the Sawtooth National Recreation Area. In Blaine County, the lake is one of the largest in the Sawtooth Wilderness and is most easily accessed via the trailhead at Pettit Lake, accessed from State Highway 75 via Sawtooth National Forest road 208.

The direct route to the lake begins at the trailhead at the end of the Pettit Lake campground. The trail requires five stream crossings, only the last of which has a bridge.

Alice Lake is within the Sawtooth Wilderness; wilderness permits are obtained at a registration box along the trail at the wilderness boundary, at the upstream end of Pettit Lake.

See also

 List of lakes of the Sawtooth Mountains (Idaho)
 Sawtooth National Forest
 Sawtooth National Recreation Area
 Sawtooth Range (Idaho)

References

External links
Alice Lake Trip Report
YouTube video – September 2020

Lakes of Idaho
Lakes of Blaine County, Idaho
Glacial lakes of the United States
Glacial lakes of the Sawtooth Wilderness
Articles containing video clips